Jushatuy, also rendered as Jushatu, may refer to:
 Jushatuy-e Olya
 Jushatuy-e Sofla